The Galil Córdova is an assault rifle designed and developed by Colombian company Indumil, based on the Galil AR. It is the main assault rifle of the Colombian Armed Forces and National Police.

The Córdova is named after Colombian independence hero José María Córdova.

History 
With the escalation of the Colombian conflict and the restrictions on the sale of arms and spare parts from manufacturing countries, the government was forced to find a supplier that would satisfy not only the demands of the conflict, but also guarantee the continuous supply of new material, spare parts, but and more importantly, the transfer of technology.

In 1994, Israel sold Galils under license and assembly equipment to the Colombian state company Indumil in 1994.

In 2015, Indumil developed a prototype semi-automatic Galil AR.

In 2020, Indumil reported the sale of 8,000 Córdova under a contract of USD$10 million. In 2021, Haiti said that they are looking into potentially purchasing the Córdovas.

Design
A modernization kit of the Galil SAR was produced to improve its current characteristics, allowing the placement of combat accessories (sights, flashlights, laser, foregrip) and improve ergonomics and user comfort through a telescoping stock. 

With the conversion kit in place, the need arose to carry out a second update to the weapon, improving some of its technical characteristics (weight, barrel length, caliber, rate of fire and ergonomics), making it also an urban defense tactical rifle adapted to the current security needs of Colombia.

Variants

Córdova 8
A version of the Córdova with an 8 inch barrel.

Córdova 13
A version of the Córdova with a 13 inch barrel.

Córdova 18
A version of the Córdova with an 18 inch barrel.

Galil-C Pistol
A version of the Córdova with a short barrel and pistol grip with no stock.

Users 

 
 : A contract was signed on September 2019 for 8,000 Córdovas for a cost of USD$10 million.

Potential Users
 : In 2021, Haiti said that there are looking into Colombian-made Córdovas.

Gallery

References 

Weapons of Colombia
Assault rifles
5.56 mm firearms